Autentico! is an album by Brazilian guitarist Bola Sete, released in 1966 through Fantasy Records. In 2004, it was reissued on CD on the anthology Voodoo Village.

Track listing

Release history

Personnel 
Paulinho da Costa – drums
Sebastiao Neto – bass guitar, percussion
Bola Sete – guitar

References 

1966 albums
Bola Sete albums
Fantasy Records albums